Chartiers Valley High School is a public school that was established in 1959 and is physically located in Collier Township, Allegheny County, Pennsylvania, United States.   The school's post-office address is Bridgeville, PA however. The school district serves Collier Township, Bridgeville Borough, Scott Township and Heidelberg Borough.

A new high school and middle school complex is being constructed at the site.  The new complex will retain its gymnasium, pool and auditorium. The school has an olympic-sized indoor swimming pool  which is open to the public three evenings a week. A small fee is charged to district residents and non residents. The school's on-site stadium was home to the professional soccer team Pittsburgh Riverhounds (2008–2012).

The school district is named for Chartiers Creek, which flows through and/or forms part of the border for all four regions the district serves (Bridgeville, Collier, Heidelberg, and Scott).  The creek itself is named after Pierre Chartier.

AP courses
Chartiers Valley High School offers the following Advanced Placement courses:

AP English 11 Language and Composition
AP English 12 Literature and Composition
AP Seminar (Capstone)
AP Research (Capstone)
AP Computer Science Principles 
AP Computer Science A (Java)
AP Microeconomics
AP Psychology
AP United States History
AP Macroeconomics
AP Government & Politics
AP Chemistry
AP Calculus AB
AP Calculus BC
AP Statistics
AP Physics 1
AP Physics 2
AP Physics C: Mechanics
AP Physics C: Electricity & Magnetism
AP Biology
AP Spanish
AP Studio Art
AP Digital Art (2D & 3D)

Awards and recognition
In 2007, Chartiers Valley High School's Art Program was awarded the Pennsylvania State Modern Language Association's Silver Globe Award.  The School had previously been awarded a Bronze Globe Award in 2005.

Also in 2005, Chartiers Valley's musical "Beauty and the Beast" won 5 awards at the 15th annual Gene Kelly Awards for Excellence in High School Musical Theatre.

Student body demographics
As of 2005:

Athletics 

State championships

2019 Girls Basketball:  Victory over Radnor Archbishop Carroll 53-40 (AAAAA).

1986 Ice Hockey:  Victory over Warminster Archbishop Wood 7-2 (AA).

State runners-up

2022 Girls Basketball:  In a rematch of last year's finals, again defeated by Springfield Cardinal O'Hara 42-19 (AAAAA).

2021 Girls Basketball:  Defeated by Springfield Cardinal O'Hara 51-27 (AAAAA).  This team set a STATE RECORD for 63 consecutive wins from 2019 to 2021 (no state championship game in 2020 due to Covid cancellations).

2010 Boys Basketball:  Defeated by Philadelphia Neuman-Goretti 65-63 (AAAAA).

2009 Baseball:  Defeated by Clarks Summit Abington Heights 3-2 (AAA).

2002 Boys Soccer:  Defeated by West Chester Henderson 2-1 (AAA)

1998 Boys Basketball: Defeated by Harrisburg Steelton-Highspire 69-45 (AAA).

Notable alumni
 (1965) Donna Feigley Barbisch, U.S. Army major general
 (1968) Joseph Markosek, representative for Pennsylvania's 25th Representative District in the Pennsylvania House of Representatives
 (1976) Kenneth Merchant, U.S. Air Force Major General
 (1983) Dave Kasper, general manager of D.C. United
 (1983) Bill Peduto, mayor of Pittsburgh
 (1985) Craig Stephens, Magisterial Judge, Scott Township Council President
 (1999) Gregg Gillis, (stage name, Girl Talk) musician
 (2001) Ray Ventrone, former football player for the NFL
 (2004) Travis MacKenzie, soccer player for Pittsburgh Riverhounds
 (2005) Adam Gazda, soccer player for Pittsburgh Riverhounds
 (2005) Tom Wallisch, professional skier
 (2006) Ross Ventrone, former football player for the NFL
 (2006) Tino Coury , pop singer
 (2009) Eric Kush, football player 
 (2010) T. J. McConnell, basketball player, Philadelphia 76ers
 (2013) Christian Kuntz, football player

References

External links
Chartiers Valley High School

Educational institutions established in 1959
Public high schools in Pennsylvania
Schools in Allegheny County, Pennsylvania
1959 establishments in Pennsylvania